Hampshire Country School (HCS) is a private boarding school for gifted children in Rindge, New Hampshire, United States, started by Henry Curtis Patey and Adelaide Walker Patey in 1948. Formerly a co-educational school, it is now a boarding school for boys between 8 and 17 years who have difficulty in other settings. The majority of the students are enrolled in grades 6 through 9.

Description
The campus includes modest buildings, three lakes, and part of the Wapack Range, a mountain ridge east of the center of campus. Daily life is structured, with after-school and weekend activities plus time for organized outdoor and indoor play. The school operates a small farm as part of the academic and residential program. The school also has a five-week summer program for boys between 8 and 14 years of age.

Hampshire Country School is not a treatment facility and does not provide treatment for any condition. While in the first 30 years of the school, Hampshire Country School provided residential treatment for children managing various emotional and environmental stresses, the school has never served one type of child, or specialized in any one particular diagnosis. Many of the children accepted in the early years of HCS Dr. Patey described as "the very bright, emotionally sensitive or fragile type of child". More recent challenges managed by some of the HCS children in the 1980s and 1990s could be associated with Asperger syndrome, nonverbal learning disorder and attention deficit hyperactivity disorder.

In May 2021 Beth Venable became the school's seventh Head of School, following founders Henry and Adelaide Patey (1948–1981), Peter Ray (1981–1996), William Dickerman (1996–2009), Bernd Föcking (2009–2020) and Elizabeth Bruno (2020-2021).

In January 2020, Dickerman, affectionately known to the students as 'Doc', passed away at Meadows House, HCS. He was 78.

The school has entered into an agreement with the Northeast Wilderness Trust to protect the grounds in perpetuity. These grounds were originally a farm. The Wapack Trail runs along the Stony Top mountain ridge on one portion of the grounds.

History

Patey advocated the concept of milieu therapy, and in the 1970s the school published an in-house journal called the Journal of Residential Therapy.

In the 1970s the school had a co-ed student population. Students lived at the school year-round and stayed in tents in a summer camp called Camp Timbertop for most of the summer. Many of these students were supported by Massachusetts special education grants. Massachusetts funding for special education under Chapter 750 became more restricted in 1972 under Chapter 766, and as a result the school elected to discontinue accepting children funded by special education funds and began limiting the student population. In 1996 the school population decreased to the current desired size of about 25 boys specifically selected for their intelligence, playfulness and good nature creating a healthy, tighter community for the students.

From the 1960s to her death in 2008, actress and screenwriter Kay Linaker (aka Kate Phillips) was an English teacher and drama coach at the school.

Animal scientist and author Temple Grandin (one of her biographies refers to the school as "The Hampshire School for Wayward Wizards", a sort of Hogwarts for today) as well as comedian Noel Murphy are alumni.

References

External links
 Hampshire Country School
 HAMPSHIRE COUNTRY SCHOOL:  A Little Personal Place
 SENG / Supporting Emotional Needs of the Gifted
 A Hampshire Country School Play

Educational institutions established in 1948
Schools in Cheshire County, New Hampshire
Private middle schools in New Hampshire
1948 establishments in New Hampshire
Boarding schools in New Hampshire
Rindge, New Hampshire